Christine Phillip (born 2 August 1947) is a German former cross-country skier. She competed in two events at the 1972 Winter Olympics.

Cross-country skiing results

Olympic Games

References

External links
 

1947 births
Living people
German female cross-country skiers
Olympic cross-country skiers of East Germany
Cross-country skiers at the 1972 Winter Olympics
People from Oberwiesenthal
Sportspeople from Saxony
20th-century German women